Luke Frederick is an American politician serving in the Minnesota House of Representatives since 2021. A member of the Democratic-Farmer-Labor Party (DFL), Frederick represents District 18B in south-central Minnesota, including the city of Mankato and parts of Blue Earth County.

Early Life, education and career 
Frederick grew up in Eagle Lake, Minnesota, and earned a B.S. in corrections from the Minnesota State University, Mankato.

Frederick has worked in the healthcare industry and was also a member of the National Civilian Community Corps. He worked at the Saint Peter Regional Treatment Center for 17 years.

Minnesota House of Representatives 
Frederick was elected to the Minnesota House of Representatives in 2020 and was reelected in 2022. He first ran after three-term DFL incumbent Jack Considine announced he would not seek reelection.

During the 2021-22 legislative session, Frederick served as vice chair of the Behavioral Health Policy Division of the Human Services Finance and Policy Committee. In 2023, he was appointed to serve as an assistant majority leader. Frederick is the vice chair of the Human Services Policy Committee and sits on the Agriculture Finance and Policy, Elections Finance and Policy, and Judiciary Finance and Civil Law Committees.

Electoral history

Personal life 
Frederick lives in Mankato, Minnesota and has two children.

References

External links 

 Official House of Representatives website

Living people
Democratic Party members of the Minnesota House of Representatives
Minnesota State University, Mankato alumni
Year of birth missing (living people)